The 1966 NCAA Skiing Championships were contested at the Crested Butte ski area in Created Butte, Colorado at the thirteenth annual NCAA-sanctioned ski tournament to determine the individual and team national champions of men's collegiate alpine skiing, cross-country skiing, and ski jumping in the United States.

Denver, coached by Willy Schaeffler, captured their tenth, and sixth consecutive, national championship, edging out locals Western State in the team standings. The Pioneers' sole individual win was by Terje Øverland in downhill.

Repeat individual champions were Mike Elliott of Fort Lewis in cross country, and Western State's Loris Werner (skimeister). Bill Marolt of Colorado won the slalom and alpine titles to add to his two previous in downhill (1963, 1965). Utah's Frithjof Prydz regained the jumping crown he won two years earlier and added the nordic.

Venue

This year's championships were held March 3–5 in Colorado at Crested Butte, north of Gunnison. 

The thirteenth edition, these were the third championships in Colorado and the first at Crested Butte; Winter Park hosted in 1956 and 1959.

Team scoring

Individual events

Four events were held, which yielded seven individual titles.
Thursday: Slalom 
Friday: Cross Country
Saturday: Downhill, Jumping

See also
List of NCAA skiing programs

References

NCAA Skiing Championships
NCAA Skiing Championships
NCAA Skiing Championships
NCAA Skiing Championships
NCAA Skiing Championships
NCAA Skiing Championships
NCAA Skiing Championships
Skiing in Colorado